Mykola Zaludyak (2 June 1941, in Vendychany, Mohyliv-Podilskyi Raion – 30 December 2010, in Poltava) was a Ukrainian politician and the first secretary (mayor) of Kremenchuk city committee of Communist Party of Ukraine.

External links 
 Mykola Zaludyak at the Official Ukraine Today portal

1941 births
2010 deaths
People from Vinnytsia Oblast
Communist Party of Ukraine (Soviet Union) politicians
Governors of Poltava Oblast
First convocation members of the Verkhovna Rada
Eleventh convocation members of the Verkhovna Rada of the Ukrainian Soviet Socialist Republic
Mayors of places in Ukraine
People from Kremenchuk
Recipients of the Honorary Diploma of the Cabinet of Ministers of Ukraine